Ludlow station is a commuter rail stop on the Metro-North Railroad's Hudson Line, located in the  Ludlow Park neighborhood of Yonkers, New York. As of August 2006, daily commuter ridership was 250 and there are 33 parking spaces.

Station layout
The station has two offset high-level side platform platforms each eight cars long. An additional track is located west of the southbound platform and is used by freight trains.

Both platforms are canopied full length and have a ramp at their extreme north ends that lead to a passageway at track level (fences separating them from the tracks) before a staircase goes up to Ludlow Street, which crosses above the line. Ticket vending machines are on the overpass. The northbound platform's walkway is part of the sidewalk of Abe Cohen Plaza, a turn-around street that also serves as the station's parking lot.

References

External links 

Ludlow Metro-North Station (TheSubwayNut)
 Ludlow Street entrance from Google Maps Street View

Metro-North Railroad stations in New York (state)
Transportation in Yonkers, New York
Railway stations in Westchester County, New York